Paul Murphy (born 20 September 1979) is a Gaelic footballer who plays for the Derry county team, with whom he has won one/two? National League titles.

Murphy plays his club football for St Canice's Dungiven and has won a Derry Senior Football Championship and Ulster Senior Club Football Championship with the club. He usually plays in the half forward line for Derry and midfield for Dungiven.

Playing career

Inter-county
Murphy made his Derry debut in 1998. He was called up to the team again during the 2000/2001 National Football League.

He was part of the Derry team that won the 2008 National League where Derry beat Kerry in the final.

Club
Murphy and Dungiven won the Derry Senior Football Championship in 1997 and the club also went on to win that year's Ulster Senior Club Football Championship. They were defeated by Corofin of Galway in the All-Ireland Club Championship semi-final the following February.

Honours

Inter-county
National Football League:
Winner (at least 1): 2008
Dr McKenna Cup:
Runner up: 2005, 2008, more?

Club
Ulster Senior Club Football Championship:
Winner: 1997
Derry Senior Football Championship:
Winner (1): 1997
Derry Senior Football League:
Winner (1): 2003

Note: The above lists may be incomplete. Please add any other honours you know of.

References

External links
Player profiles on Official Derry GAA website

1979 births
Living people
Derry inter-county Gaelic footballers
Dungiven Gaelic footballers
People from Dungiven